Cannon Dial Elm Club, also known as Cannon Club, is one of the historic Eating Clubs at Princeton University. Founded in 1895, it completed its current clubhouse in 1910. The club closed in the early 1970s and later merged with Dial Lodge and Elm Club to form Dial, Elm, Cannon (DEC), which closed its doors in 1998. In 2011 DEC reopened, now bearing the name Cannon Dial Elm Club, using its historic clubhouse, which had served as the home for the Office of Population Research during the club's hiatus.

History

Founding

The Eating Clubs play a central role in the history and life of Princeton University, serving as the primary place of dining and social life for more than 70% of upperclassmen.  Cannon Club was founded in 1895 and housed in a small house on William Street that had been home to Tiger Inn for the previous two years. From 1896 to 1899 it was located in the "Incubator" a small house, at that time on Olden Street, that served as an early home to many of the Eating Clubs as they established themselves and sought to build clubhouses. In 1899, Cannon Club purchased the Osborn House that stood on the south side of Prospect Avenue, between the McCosh and West residences. That home fell into disrepair by 1908 and Edgar Viguers Seeler, a prominent Philadelphia architect, was commissioned to build a new clubhouse. That Collegiate Gothic clubhouse, completed in 1910, was the first of the clubs to make use of local stone. While the facade has been described as plain in comparison with other clubs, the rear elevation and interiors have been praised, with the two-story living room considered one of the finest interior spaces found on Prospect. The eponymous cannon sits in front of the clubhouse, pointed at Prospect Avenue. President-elect Woodrow Wilson, on a last stroll before departing for Washington, commented to reporters: "Hardly a chummy entrance that!"

Demise

The club was famous for its debauchery, gaining a reputation as the Animal House of the university. One story from 1966 relates a nighttime coed nude volleyball game during Houseparties, the annual Princeton formal dance, though the club's own history disputes that it was coed. In the late 1960s the club gained a reputation for destructive behavior, including the destruction of a wall in neighboring Campus Club with sledgehammers, and the laceration of an artery of club president Michael Ryan while being passed down the stairs. The club also became involved in an incident of racial prejudice. In May 1969, one Cannon Club member loudly shouted the "N" word at a group of [African-American] students from the window of the "Rockefeller Suite" (a group of dorm rooms occupied by members of Cannon Club). That incitement led to the invasion of the largely unoccupied "Rockefeller Suite by a large group of [African American] students wielding knives, pipes and other weapons. Several couches and chairs were slashed and some other damage resulted. When retaliation was threatened by Cannon Club members, the University Administration became involved, holding an extended investigation into the entire affair. However, no Cannon Club members were expelled or suspended as a result, despite reports to the contrary . The same year, an instructor's pregnant wife was accosted and held off the ground by a Cannon Club member on Prospect Street in front of the club, however the identity of the Club member was never determined by the Administration. The notoriety and sanctions by the university led to a fall in membership, ultimately precipitating the closure of the club in the early 1970s. The property came into the possession of the university, which spent 3/4 of a million dollars on renovations and deferred maintenance to turn the clubhouse into an academic building, Notestein Hall, which housed the Office of Population Research for over 30 years.

Reopening

Despite the closure of the club, Cannon Club continued as a graduate board determined to continue the club's traditions and see it one day reopened. In 1989, Cannon merged with the financially imperiled Dial Lodge, and the combined entity was joined by Elm Club the following year. The stated goal of the new Dial Elm Cannon Club (DEC) was to exchange the Dial and Elm clubhouses for the old Cannon Club. In 1997, an agreement was reached to exchange Dial and Elm for the Cannon clubhouse and $2 million.  The club was unable to reopen Cannon at that time but retained the option to purchase the building. This led to the second demise of the club with periodic claims that Cannon would reopen, a feat accomplished in 2011. Today, the club is again thriving and healthy.

Notable Alumni
Robert Baldwin — Chairman of Morgan Stanley, Under Secretary of the Navy (1965-1967)
The Hon. Paul Sarbanes — US House of Representatives (1971-77) and US Senator (1977-2007)
Norman Augustine — Chairman and CEO of Lockheed Martin, Under Secretary of the Army (1975-1977), Chairman of the Augustine Spaceflight Committee  
Bill Haarlow — President of Chemicals Division of Quaker Oats Company and later owner
Art Hyland  — Secretary/editor of NCAA  Basketball Rules Committee
Jim Morgan — President & CEO of Philip Morris USA, CEO of Atari
John "Rocky" Barrett — Chairman of the Citizen Potawatomi Nation
Frank Biondi — Sr. Managing Partner of Waterview Advisors, Trustee of Princeton University
Jay Higgins — Vice Chairman of Salomon Brothers, Owner of Waterville Golf Links
Mike O’Neill — Chairman of CitiGroup, CEO of Barclays, CEO of the Bank of Hawaii.
James Billington — 13th Librarian of Congress (1987-2015)
Thomas Christie — Chief Operating Officer of Showtime Networks Inc
Karl Chandler — (ret) NFL Football player, NY Giants & Detroit Lions
Mark Milley — Chairman of the Joint Chiefs of Staff, Chief of Staff of the Army
John C. Bogle — Founder and chief executive of The Vanguard Group
Stan Rubin — Conductor, The Stan Rubin Orchestra
Robert Caro — Lyndon Johnson and Robert Moses biographer, Two time Pulitzer Prize winner and National Humanities Medal Recipient
Frank Stella — Painter & Sculptor, National Medal of Arts Recipient
John Streicker — Chairman of Sentinel Real Estate Corporation
Bradford L. Smith — President & Chief Legal Officer of Microsoft, Princeton University Trustee
Katherine Brittain Bradley — Founder and President of the CityBridge Foundation, Princeton University Trustee
Steve Papa — Founder of CEO Endeca, Founder and Chairman of Parallel Wireless

References

External links 
 

Eating clubs at Princeton University
Historic district contributing properties in Mercer County, New Jersey